Powers Township is a township in Cass County, Minnesota, United States. The population was 918 at the 2000 census. Powers Township was named for Gorham Powers, a Minnesota politician who owned land there.

Geography
According to the United States Census Bureau, the township has a total area of 35.3 square miles (91.5 km), of which 28.7 square miles (74.3 km) is land and 6.7 square miles (17.2 km) (18.83%) is water.

The city of Backus is located entirely within Powers Township geographically but is a separate entity.

Major highways
  Minnesota State Highway 87
  Minnesota State Highway 371

Lakes
 Bass Lake
 Beuber Lake
 Big Portage Lake
 Blind Lake (southwest half)
 Bowen Lake (vast majority)
 Brookway Lake
 Crooked Lake
 Fawn Lake
 Four Point Lake
 Horseshoe Lake
 Island Lake
 Johnson Lake
 Lindsey Lake
 Little Boy Lake (southwest half)
 Loon Lake
 Mud Lake (west three-quarters)
 Ox Yoke Lake
 Pickerel Lake
 Pine Mountain Lake (east half)
 Rainy Lake
 Rice Portage Lake (west half)
 Round Lake (southwest half)
 Sanborn Lake
 Swede Lake
 Tamarack Lake
 Twin Lakes
 Willard Lake

Adjacent townships
 Birch Lake Township (north)
 Woodrow Township (northeast)
 Ponto Lake Township (east)
 Barclay Township (southeast)
 Pine River Township (south)
 Bull Moose Township (southwest)
 Deerfield Township (west)
 Hiram Township (northwest)

Cemeteries
The township contains Evergreen Cemetery.

Demographics
At the 2000 census, there were 918 people, 340 households and 239 families residing in the township. The population density was 32.0 per square mile (12.4/km). There were 800 housing units at an average density of 27.9/sq mi (10.8/km). The racial makeup of the township was 98.04% White, 0.11% African American, 1.42% Native American, 0.11% from other races, and 0.33% from two or more races.

There were 340 households, of which 24.7% had children under the age of 18 living with them, 58.8% were married couples living together, 6.8% had a female householder with no husband present, and 29.7% were non-families. 24.4% of all households were made up of individuals, and 11.5% had someone living alone who was 65 years of age or older. The average household size was 2.41 and the average family size was 2.81.

Age distribution was 20.3% under the age of 18, 4.7% from 18 to 24, 19.2% from 25 to 44, 28.0% from 45 to 64, and 27.9% who were 65 years of age or older.  The median age was 49 years. For every 100 females, there were 93.3 males. For every 100 females age 18 and over, there were 88.7 males.

The median household income was $40,547, and the median family income was $44,028. Males had a median income of $28,250 versus $21,125 for females. The per capita income for the township was $16,140.  About 6.6% of families and 13.6% of the population were below the poverty line, including 12.1% of those under age 18 and 24.9% of those age 65 or over.

References
 United States National Atlas
 United States Census Bureau 2007 TIGER/Line Shapefiles
 United States Board on Geographic Names (GNIS)

Townships in Cass County, Minnesota
Brainerd, Minnesota micropolitan area
Townships in Minnesota